Alexander Field is a baseball venue in West Lafayette, Indiana, United States.  It is home to the Purdue Boilermakers baseball team of the NCAA Division I Big Ten Conference.  The field hosted its first game in spring 2013.  The venue has a capacity of 1,500 spectators that is expandable to 2,500 spectators.  It is named for John and Anna Margaret Ross Alexander, Purdue alumni and the parents of former Purdue head baseball coach Dave Alexander

History
Construction began following the 2011 season, and the venue was scheduled to be completed for the start of the 2012 season.  However, construction delays pushed back the field's completion to spring 2013.  Due to the delays, Purdue, which was selected to host a regional in the 2012 NCAA Tournament, had to host the regional at U.S. Steel Yard in nearby Gary.

It replaced Lambert Field as the home of the Boilermakers.

With Loeb Stadium demolished to make way for a new stadium still under construction, the Lafayette Aviators were supposed to play the 2020 Prospect League season at Alexander Field; however, their season was suspended when Purdue closed its athletic facilities due to the COVID-19 pandemic.

Features
The stadium features a press box, clubhouse, indoor hitting facility, suites and stadium lighting.

See also
 List of NCAA Division I baseball venues

References

External links
Photo Gallery of Alexander Field construction in July 2012 from PurdueSports.com
Photo Gallery of Alexander Field in March 2020 from PurdueSports.com

2013 establishments in Indiana
Baseball venues in Indiana
College baseball venues in the United States
Purdue Boilermakers baseball
Purdue University buildings
Sports venues completed in 2013